Guanling Buyei and Miao Autonomous County is an autonomous county in Anshun City, in the southwest of Guizhou Province, China.

Area: 

Population: 334,900 in 2008.

Postal Code: 561300.

Telephone Area Code: 0853

The county government is located in Guansuo town.

Transportation 
Guanxing Highway
China National Highway 320
G60 Shanghai–Kunming Expressway
Guanling railway station

Climate

References

External links
Official website of Guanling Government

 
County-level divisions of Guizhou
Bouyei autonomous counties
Miao autonomous counties